Al-Ittihad Stadium is a football stadium  in Aleppo, Syria. It is owned by the Aleppo-based Al-Ittihad SC and has a capacity of 20,000 spectators.

Overview
In 1972, a 4,000 m² piece of land in the al-Shahbaa district of Aleppo was allocated by the Syrian Government to build the stadium of Al-Ittihad SC. Along with the surrounding facilities, the stadium was completed by the end of the 1980s.

Currently, the stadium is mainly used as a training ground by Al-Ittihad SC.

References

See also
List of football stadiums in Syria

Football venues in Syria
Sports venues in Aleppo
1980s establishments in Syria
Sports venues completed in the 1980s